Ring finger protein 213 is a protein that in humans is encoded by the RNF213 gene. RNF213 is a 591kDa cytosolic E3 Ubiquitin-ligase with RING finger and AAA+ ATPase domains.

Clinical relevance
Chromosome-wide linkage analysis found that moyamoya disease locus resides in chromosome 17q25. Genome-wide linkage analysis of 15 Japanese families of autosomal dominant moyamoya disease narrowed down the locus to 17q25.3. Direct sequencing of the region and whole-exome sequencing identified the p.Arg4810Lys mutation in RNF213 gene as a founder mutation of moyamoya disease. A genome-wide association study also identified RNF213 as a disease causing gene for Moyamoya disease. Comparative evolutionary genome sequencing analyses in humans and monkeys showed that the strongest evidence for acceleration along the branch leading to hominines was RNF213. RNF213 has been shown to be associated with blood flow and oxygen consumption. Given that oxygen and glucose consumption scales with total neuron number, RNF213 may have played a role in facilitating the evolution of larger brains in primates.

References

Further reading 

 
 
 
 
 
 
 

RING finger proteins